Nihm District is a district of the Sana'a Governorate, Yemen. As of 2003, the district had a population of 41,502 inhabitants.

Climate

References

Districts of Sanaa Governorate
Nihm District